Mistress Matisse (born November 21, 1971) is a professional dominatrix, blogger, and columnist for Seattle-based alternative newspaper, The Stranger.  Her bi-weekly columns, entitled The Control Tower, offer sexuality-related advice about polyamory, kink, and the business side of her work, as well as the BDSM culture at large.

In March 2017, Matisse along with Chelsea Cebara, started to market a cannabis-based personal lubricant called Velvet Swing. Due to legal restrictions, the product is only available in Washington State and California.

References

External links

 Articles in The Stranger — November 11, 2001–present
 Mistress Matisse's Journal — personal blog
 Mistress Matisse of Seattle — professional site
 Mistress Matisse's Podcast
 Radio Blowfish podcasts — interviews with Matisse in episodes 37 and 57
 Polyamory Weekly Podcast — interviews with Matisse in #105 and #106.  Her writing is also mentioned in #81.

Living people
American women journalists
American bloggers
BDSM writers
Writers from Seattle
American dominatrices
Polyamory
21st-century American non-fiction writers
American women bloggers
21st-century American women writers
1971 births